Jeff Noble (born March 31, 1961) is an American pastor and former politician from Michigan.

Early life 
Noble was born in Wilmington, Ohio.

Education 
In 1984, Noble graduated from Francis Marion College. In 1996, Noble earned a M.Div. degree from Southeastern Baptist Theological Seminary.

Career 
In 1999, Noble became a Lead Pastor of a Main Street Baptist church in Canton Michigan. In 2008, He partnered Main Street Baptist with the First Baptist Church of Plymouth and created Praise Baptist Church where he continued pastoring until August 2017. In November 2017, her formed Four Winds Church were he remains as pastor currently. 
On November 8, 2016, Noble won the election and became a member of Michigan House of Representatives for District 20. Noble defeated Colleen Pobur with 53.59% of the votes. Noble served District 20 until December 2018.

Jeff Noble is currently The Senior Pastor of Four Winds Church in Livonia, Michigan

Personal life 
Noble's wife is Myra Noble (Deceased-2021). They have three children.

References

External links 
 Jeff Noble at ballotready.org
 Jeff Noble at ballotpedia.org

1961 births
Living people
Republican Party members of the Michigan House of Representatives
21st-century American politicians